is a passenger railway station located in the town of Sayō, Sayō District, Hyōgo Prefecture, Japan, operated by West Japan Railway Company (JR West).

Lines

Station layout
The station consists of one ground-level side platform serving a single bi-directional track. The station is unattended.

History
Harima-Tokusa Station opened on July 30, 1935.  With the privatization of the Japan National Railways (JNR) on April 1, 1987, the station came under the aegis of the West Japan Railway Company.

Passenger statistics
In fiscal 2019, the station was used by an average of 91 passengers daily.

Surrounding area
 Sayo Town Hall Nanko Branch

See also
List of railway stations in Japan

References

External links

 Station Official Site

Railway stations in Hyōgo Prefecture
Kishin Line
Railway stations in Japan opened in 1935
Sayō, Hyōgo